HLG may refer to:

 Hall Green railway station, in England
 Hannibal–LaGrange University, in Missouri, United States
 Helene-Lange-Gymnasium, a school in Hamburg, Germany
 Hidden Lake Gardens, a botanical garden in Michigan, United States
 Hip Land Group, a Japanese entertainment conglomerate
 Hong Leong Group, a Malaysian conglomerate
 Hybrid log–gamma, a high-dynamic-range (HDR) system
 Wheeling Ohio County Airport, in West Virginia, United States